Alec (Alirza) Rasizade is a retired Azerbaijani-American professor of history and political science, who specialized in Sovietology, primarily known for the typological model (or "algorithm" in his own words), which describes the impact of a drop in oil revenues on the process of decline in rentier states by stages and cycles of their general socio-economic degradation upon the end of an oil boom. He has also authored more than 200 studies on the history of international relations, Perestroika reforms and breakup of the USSR, oil diplomacy and contemporary politics in the post-Soviet states and autonomies of Russia, Central Asia and the Caucasus.

Education and scholarship 
Rasizade was born in Nakhchivan in the Azerbaijan SSR in 1947 and graduated from the history department of Baku State University in 1969, then graduated and received a PhD in history from Moscow State University in 1974, and the doctor of history degree from the USSR Academy of Sciences in 1990. He subsequently worked as a professor of history at Azerbaijan State University from 1974 to 1980, and a senior research fellow at Azerbaijan National Academy of Sciences from 1981 to 1990.

Upon the demise of the USSR in 1991, Rasizade emigrated to the United States as a visiting professor of history at the University of South Florida in Tampa. Furthermore, as a Fulbright professor, he taught Soviet history in the 1990s at Stanford, Berkeley, UCLA, Harvard, SAIS, Monmouth and other universities. After obtaining a PhD in history from Columbia University in 1995, he worked at its Harriman Institute. In 2000, Rasizade was invited to Washington to work at the Center for Strategic and International Studies, whereupon in 2004 he moved to the newly established Historical Research Center of the National Academy of Sciences, where wrote his most significant works until retiring upon its closure in 2013.

He occasionally participates in academic, educational, social, analytical and legislative events, discussions, panels, peer reviews, interviews, broadcasts and hearings as an expert in post-Soviet affairs. He is also an advisory or editorial board member in a number of the world's leading academic journals in his field of regional studies and an emeritus professor of Baku State University.

Significant studies 
Rasizade's academic contribution to Sovietology may be divided into four general categories: Caspian oil boom, Russia, Azerbaijan and Central Asia. His ideas and conclusions for each of these major studies are summarized in the following theses:

1) Having an insider knowledge of Caspian oil reserves, Rasizade precisely calculated and predicted in his writings the exact end of the second Baku oil boom of 2005–2014, notwithstanding the geopolitical euphoria of the 1990s in Western capitals based on exaggerated estimates by American academia, Azerbaijani government and Caspian oil consortium.

2) On Russia, he wrote that Putin's Bonapartism was a natural result of the 1990s turmoil, when the society as a whole and the nouveau riches in particular, longed for a strongman who could establish order, stability and legitimacy for the illegally acquired wealth even at the expense of civil rights restriction. Furthermore, Rasizade argues that demise of the USSR was only the first stage in the process of Russian Federation's own breakup or, as he put it bluntly, Russia is doomed to disintegrate as did all multinational empires in history.

3) Azerbaijan, in his view, is a classic Middle Eastern petrostate, which will eventually sink into its legitimate place among the impoverished Muslim nations with the end of oil boom, as is predetermined by its culture, endemic corruption and lack of industrial endowment. He insists that the oil boom was just an aberration on Azerbaijan's natural path from communism into the Third world.

4) As for Central Asia, his main argument has been the futility of US efforts to impose there the democratic values of European civilization, since democracy in Muslim countries inevitably leads to election and entrenchment of Islamofascism. Instead of direct Western intervention in the region, he recommends support for the local despots who are able to maintain peace in the region and order in their countries by brutally effective methods of the same Islam.

Rasizade's algorithm 
The most outstanding work of Rasizade, which gained an international acclaim, was the eponymous algorithm of decline theory, described in his 2008 article at the peak of oil prices, when nothing foreshadowed their steep fall and the subsequent onset of global economic recession with irreversible consequences for oil-exporting nations. Prior to that, the effect of rising oil prices, rendered to strengthen the national currencies and affect the economies of rentier states as a result of oil boom, was described only by the "Dutch disease" theory, first introduced in 1977.

However, this theory could not foretell the further course of events after a drop in oil prices on the world market: what would have turned out for oil-dependent countries upon the end of their oil booms? And precisely that happened in 2008, when the price of oil collapsed from $147 per barrel in the middle of the year to $32 by its end, i.e. by 75 percent. Exactly at that moment came out of press the aforementioned article, in which Rasizade explained the chain reaction of an unavoidable sequence of events in the process of impoverishment, degradation and decline in living standards of nations whose welfare depends on the export of natural resources, when one change inevitably entails another. Appearance of the article was so timely that the described algorithm, which was unfolding in real time, had been picked up in scholarly literature as a typological model by the name of its author.

Rasizade's algorithm may be described succinctly as the following chain reaction: a decline in oil production or a drop in the price of oil translates into a synchronous fall in the inflow of petrodollars, which results in the collapse of treasury's revenues and expenditures, which leads to devaluation of the local currency, which ensues (in a free market) a tumble in prices of goods, services and real estate in dollar terms, which squeezes the tax base, which entails the redundancy of government bureaucracy, nationwide layoffs and bankruptcies in the private sector, which further squeezes the tax base, which results in cutting wages and social benefits, which causes mass unemployment and impoverishment of the populace, which triggers a growing dissatisfaction of power elite, which brings about a regime change with redistribution of wealth and property.

After this, the whole cycle repeats itself on a lower level of revenues and living standards until the final slump of this country into its historically legitimate and economically stable place among the third world nations. This is the final stage of algorithm, after which an industrial development may (or may not, as the experience of backward countries shows) begin in a given state — such a prediction does not lend itself to political or economic calculations and depends on the mentality and traditions of each particular nation. Therefore, after adjusting to new standards of living, these nations can exist in the condition of entropy indefinitely.

References

Notable publications 
 Alec Rasizade. Na Afghanistan het nieuwe Grote Spel in Centraal-Azië (translated into Dutch by G.J.Telkamp). = Internationale Spectator (The Hague: Netherlands Institute of International Relations), October 2002, volume 56, number 10, pages 494-500.
 Alec Rasizade. Dictators, Islamists, big powers and ordinary people: the new ‘great game’ in Central Asia. = Internationale Politik und Gesellschaft (Bonn: F.Ebert Stiftung), July 2002, number 3, pages 90-106.
 Alec Rasizade. A propos of the Georgian war: reflections on Russia's revanchism in its near abroad. = Journal of Balkan and Near Eastern Studies (London: Taylor & Francis), March 2009, volume 11, number 1, pages 9-27.
 Alec Rasizade. Azerbaijan descending into the Third World after a decade of independence. = Comparative Studies of South Asia, Africa and the Middle East (Duke University Press), 2002 double issue, volume 22, numbers 1-2, pages 127—139.
 Alec Rasizade. Putin’s place in Russian history. = International Politics (London: Palgrave-Macmillan), September 2008, volume 45, number 5, pages 531-553.
 Alec Rasizade. Azerbaijan after the first decade of capitalism. = Central Asia and the Caucasus (Eastview Press, Sweden), number 3 (21) 2003, pages 99-108.
 Alec Rasizade. The hollows and pitfalls behind big oil prospects in Azerbaijan. = Central Asia and the Caucasus (Eastview Press, Sweden), number 1 (7) 2001, pages 152-164.
 Alec Rasizade. The mythology of munificent Caspian bonanza and its concomitant pipeline geopolitics. = Central Asia and the Caucasus (Eastview Press, Sweden), number 4 (10) 2001, pages 16-28.
 Alec Rasizade. Entering the old ‘great game’ in Central Asia. = Orbis (Philadelphia: Pergamon Press for Foreign Policy Research Institute), Winter 2003, volume 47, number 1, pages 41-58.
 Alec Rasizade. Putin’s mission in the Russian Thermidor. = Communist and Post-Communist Studies (Amsterdam: Elsevier publishers for the University of California), March 2008, volume 41, number 1, pages 1-25.
 Alec Rasizade. L'imbroglio du Karabakh: une perspective azérie (translated into French by B.Eisenbaum). = Les Cahiers de l'Orient (Paris), Hiver 2011, numéro 101, pages 83–95.
 Alec Rasizade. Azerbaijan after a decade of independence: less oil, more graft and poverty. = Central Asian Survey (London: Taylor & Francis), December 2002, volume 21, number 4, pages 349-370.
 Alec Rasizade. The mythology of munificent Caspian bonanza and its concomitant pipeline geopolitics. = Central Asian Survey (London: Taylor & Francis), March 2002, volume 21, number 1, pages 37-54.
 Alec Rasizade. Azerbaijan in transition to the new age of democracy. = Communist and Post-Communist Studies (Los Angeles), September 2003, volume 36, number 3, pages 345—372.
 Alec Rasizade. Azerbaijan's prospects in Nagorno-Karabakh. = Journal of Balkan and Near Eastern Studies (London: Taylor & Francis), June 2011, volume 13, number 2, pages 215-231.
 Alec Rasizade. Azerbaijan after Heydar Aliev. = Nationalities Papers (London: Taylor & Francis), March 2004, volume 32, number 1, pages 137-164.
 Alec Rasizade. Azerbaijan's prospects in Nagorno-Karabakh with the end of oil boom. = Iran and the Caucasus (Leiden: Brill), 2011 double issue, volume 15, numbers 1-2, pages 299-317.
 Alec Rasizade. The great game of Caspian energy: ambitions and the reality. = Journal of Southern Europe and the Balkans (London: Taylor & Francis), April 2005, volume 7, number 1, pages 1-17.
 Alec Rasizade. Azerbaijan's prospects in Nagorno-Karabakh. = Mediterranean Quarterly (Duke University Press), Summer 2011, volume 22, number 3, pages 72-94.
 Ali Rasizade. Türkiye açısından Truman Doktrini ve Stalin diplomasisinin hataları (translated into Turkish by M.Ahmedov). = Belleten (Ankara: Türk Tarih Kurumu), April 1991, volume 55, number 212, pages 239-255.
 Alec Rasizade. Book review: Let Our Fame be Great, by Oliver Bullough (London: Penguin Books, 2011, 512 pages). = Debatte: Journal of Contemporary Central and Eastern Europe (London: Taylor & Francis), December 2011, volume 19, issue 3, pages 689-692.

External links 

 Worldcat identity search: Alec Rasizade.
 Worldcat author catalogue listing: Alec Rasizade.
 Google Scholar cross reference citations of his works.
 A collection of his publications and citations at Research Gate.
 Academic studies by A.Rasizade published in JSTOR journals.
 A selection of his most popular articles from the Free Library archive.
 Works of A.Rasizade published by Duke University Press.
 Alec Rasizade's publications mentioned in Google Books.

20th-century American historians
20th-century American male writers
Historians of Russia
Historians of communism
Historians of the Caucasus
American political scientists
Russian studies scholars
Historians of Central Asia
International relations scholars
Baku State University alumni
Moscow State University alumni
Columbia University alumni
Soviet emigrants to the United States
American people of Azerbaijani descent
Academic staff of Baku State University
Azerbaijani political scientists
People from the Nakhchivan Autonomous Republic
1947 births
Living people
American male non-fiction writers